Alex Hepburn is an English singer and songwriter. She has released two studio albums, Together Alone (2013) and Things I've Seen (2019).

Career
Hepburn released her eponymous debut EP in June 2012. In April 2013, she released her debut studio album Together Alone. In July 2018, she released her EP If You Stay and in April 2019, she released her second studio album, Things I've Seen.

Hepburn was the opening act for the Bruno Mars European Doo-Wops & Hooligans tour and opened for him again at British Summer Time in 2018, in London's Hyde Park on the main stage. She has also opened for Lianne La Havas, Alex Clare, Texas, Amy Macdonald, James Morrison and headlined three European tours.

Discography

Albums

EPs
 Alex Hepburn (2012)
 If You Stay (2018)

Singles

(*Did not appear in main Ultratop charts, but in bubbling under Ultratip charts. Added 50 positions to actual Ultratip chart position)

Other charted songs

References

External links 
 Official Website

Living people
Singers from London
English women singer-songwriters
21st-century English women singers
Year of birth missing (living people)